Galician Left (EG, Esquerda Galega in Galician language) was a Galician nationalist and leftist political party of Galicia.

History
It was founded in December 1980 as a refoundation of the Galician Workers Party, integrating the majority of the members of the self-dissolved Galician Workers Party and members of the BN-PG, Galician Socialist Party, Communist Party of Galicia and the Communist Movement of Galicia. The party celebrated its First Congress in March 1981, accepting the constitutional framework and the autonomous institutions as a valid framework to achieve the self-determination of Galicia.

In the Galician elections of 1981 EG obtained 33,497 votes (3.32%) and a seat for its leader, Camilo Nogueira, who achieved great prominence in the Galician Parliament, although the party suffered a sharp setback in the 1982 general elections with only 22,310 votes (1.72%).

In 1984 the party merged with the Galician Socialist Party to create the Galician Socialist Party-Galician Left (PSG-EG).

Elections

References

1980 establishments in Spain
1984 disestablishments in Spain
Defunct socialist parties in Galicia (Spain)
Galician nationalist parties
Left-wing nationalist parties
Political parties disestablished in 1984
Political parties established in 1980